From the Hot Afternoon is an album by American jazz saxophonist Paul Desmond featuring performances recorded in 1969 and released on the CTI label.

Track listing
 "October (Outubro)" - (Fernando Brant, Milton Nascimento) - 3:00
 "Round N' Round (Gira Girou)" (Nascimento) - 4:32
 "Faithful Brother (Irmão de Fé)" (Nascimento) - 3:09
 "To Say Goodbye" (Edu Lobo) - 4:01
 "From the Hot Afternoon" (Nascimento) - 3:31
 "Circles" (Lobo) - 3:46
 "Martha & Romao" (Lobo) - 3:05
 "Catavento" (Nascimento) - 2:46
 "Canto Latino (Latin Chant)" (Nascimento) - 4:25
 "Crystal Illusions" (Johnny Guarnieri, Lani Hall, Lobo) - 4:41
 "Gira Girou (Round 'n' Round)" [alternate take] (Nascimento) - 4:21 Bonus track on CD reissue
 "Faithful Brother (Irmão de Fé)" [alternate take] (Nascimento) - 2:49 Bonus track on CD reissue
 "From the Hot Afternoon" [alternate take] (Nascimento) - 3:56 Bonus track on CD reissue
 "Catavento" [alternate take] (Nascimento) - 2:31 Bonus track on CD reissue
 "Canto Latino (Latin Chant)" [alternate take] (Nascimento) - 4:01 Bonus track on CD reissue
 "From the Hot Afternoon" [alternate take 2] (Nascimento) - 2:38 Bonus track on CD reissue

Recorded at Van Gelder Studio in Englewood Cliffs, New Jersey on June 24 (tracks 1 & 5-7), June 25 (tracks 3, 4, 10 & 12), August 13 (tracks 5, 13 & 16), and August 14 (tracks 2, 8, 9, 11, 14 & 15), 1969

Personnel 

Paul Desmond - alto saxophone
Edu Lobo - guitar
Dorio Ferreira - guitar
Ron Carter - bass
Airto Moreira - drums, percussion
Marky Markowitz, Marvin Stamm - trumpet, flugelhorn
Paul Faulise - bass trombone
James Buffington - French horn
Phil Bodner, George Marge - saxophone, clarinet, oboe
Don Hammond, Hubert Laws - flute, alto flute
Stan Webb, Jr. - flute, alto flute, percussion
Pat Rebillot - electric piano, keyboards
Jack Jennings - percussion
Lewis Eley, Paul Gershmman, George Ockner, Eugene Orloff, Raoul Poliakin, Max Pollikoff, Matthew Raimondi, Sylvan Shulman, Avram Weiss - violin
Charles McCracken, George Ricci - cello
Margaret Ross - harp
Wanda De Sah, Edu Lobo - vocal
Don Sebesky - arranger

Production 
Creed Taylor - producer
Rudy Van Gelder - engineer
Pete Turner - photography

Reception

Allmusic reviewer Richard S. Ginell states "Paul Desmond's first genuine all-Brazilian album under the Creed Taylor signature was a beauty".

References

CTI Records albums
Paul Desmond albums
1969 albums
Albums produced by Creed Taylor
Albums arranged by Don Sebesky
Albums recorded at Van Gelder Studio